Frida Tsai (born 2 September 1971) is a Taiwanese activist and politician. She served in the Legislative Yuan from 2016 to 2020, contested the Nantou County magistracy later that year, and in 2023, was reelected to the Legislative Yuan.

Early life
Tsai was born on 2 September 1971 and raised in Yuchi, Nantou by her grandparents. As a teen, she moved to Taipei to live with her parents and later earned a Ph.D from National Taiwan University. She then taught at Shih Hsin University.

Activism
Tsai is an active member of the Taiwan Rural Front, serving as the group's spokesperson. In this position, she was critical of the agricultural policies supported by the Ma Ying-jeou administration, describing the Land Expropriation Act in particular as "a tool for land developers and speculators." Tsai has led multiple protests as part of her advocacy for farmers' rights. In 2013, she mobilized a few hundred people to occupy the Executive Yuan, after the Miaoli County Government announced that it would repurpose land belonging to four families in Zhunan Township.

Political career
In November 2015, the Democratic Progressive Party announced that Tsai had been placed on its party list for the January 2016 legislative elections. She was subsequently elected to the Legislative Yuan via proportional representation. In June, Tsai was invited to participate in a tribunal called to review cases under the purview of the International Covenant on Economic, Social and Cultural Rights. During her legislative tenure, Tsai proposed amendments to the Animal Protection Act that require permits to be issued before animals can perform in public. She has also cosponsored an amendment to the Housing Act differentiating between property and residency rights. Tsai became founding leader of the Taiwan-Italy Inter-Parliamentary Amity Association within the Legislative Yuan in December 2016. Tsai faced Ma Wen-chun in Nantou County's second district during the 2020 legislative elections. Tsai was nominated Democratic Progressive Party candidate for the Nantou County magistracy during the 2022 local election cycle. After losing the election to Hsu Shu-hua, Tsai was a candidate for the by-election to fill Hsu's legislative seat. Tsai narrowly defeated former magistrate Lin Ming-chen, becoming the first DPP legislator to serve the Nantou II constituency.

Political stances
Due to public health concerns, Tsai supports limits on the amount of genetically modified food allowed to enter the Taiwanese market, stating that imported soybeans specifically should be graded and labeled before distribution and use. Tsai also backed an increase in government funding for plant breeding research.

References

1971 births
Living people
Academic staff of Shih Hsin University
Farmers' rights activists
National Taiwan University alumni
Members of the 9th Legislative Yuan
Democratic Progressive Party Members of the Legislative Yuan
Party List Members of the Legislative Yuan
21st-century Taiwanese women politicians
Taiwanese women activists
Members of the 10th Legislative Yuan
Nantou County Members of the Legislative Yuan